Scott Darbyshire (born 16 February 1979) is a professional English darts player who plays in Professional Darts Corporation events.

He earned a PDC Tour Card in 2017, as one of the top 12 ranked players on the Q-School Order of Merit.

References

External links

1979 births
Living people
English darts players
People from Atherton, Greater Manchester
Professional Darts Corporation former tour card holders